Tropical Love is a 1921 American silent drama film directed by Ralph Ince and starring Ruth Clifford, Reginald Denny and Huntley Gordon. It was partly shot on location in Puerto Rico.

Cast
 Ruth Clifford as Rosario
 F.A. Turner as The Seeker 
 Reginald Denny as The Drifter
 Huntley Gordon as Clifford Fayne
 Ernest Hilliard as Carlos Blasco
 Carl Axzelle as Miguel
 Margaret Cullington as Mercedita 
 Paul Doucet as Pedro

References

Bibliography
 Munden, Kenneth White. The American Film Institute Catalog of Motion Pictures Produced in the United States, Part 1. University of California Press, 1997.

External links

1921 films
1921 drama films
American black-and-white films
Silent American drama films
American silent feature films
1920s English-language films
Films directed by Ralph Ince
Associated Exhibitors films
Films shot in Puerto Rico
Films set in Puerto Rico
1920s American films